True Colours is the fifth studio album by the English jazz-funk band Level 42, released on 5 October 1984 by Polydor Records. Beyond the band's native United Kingdom, the album was released in 10-plus other countries, including Japan, Germany and the United States of America. The album peaked at #14 in the UK Albums Chart.

The first single released, "Hot Water", hit  #18 on the UK Singles Chart, #7 in Belgium and #3 in the Netherlands, and has become a staple in Level 42's live sets to the present day. The second single  "The Chant Has Begun", released in many countries, peaked at #41 in the UK Singles Chart.

"Hot Water" was released in the US in 1986 (after being featured in a single version on the US version of band's follow-up studio album World Machine) and entered the Billboard Hot 100, at #87.

Track listing
Side A
"The Chant Has Begun" (King, P. Gould) – 5:23
"Kansas City Milkman"  (Badarou, King, Lindup, P. Gould) – 5.31
"Seven Days"  (P. Gould, King, Lindup, R. Gould) – 4:26
"Hot Water" (King, P. Gould, Lindup, Badarou) – 5:41

Side B
"A Floating Life" (King, P. Gould) – 5:14
"True Believers" (King, P. Gould) – 5:03
"My Hero" (King, P. Gould, R. Gould) – 4:15 [originally a bonus track on the CD and cassette]
"Kouyate" (King, P. Gould, Badarou) – 4:52
"Hours by the Window" (King, P. Gould) – 5:10

Personnel
Level 42
 Mark King – vocals, bass, percussion
 Mike Lindup – vocals, keyboards
 Boon Gould – guitars
 Phil Gould – drums, percussion
with:
 Wally Badarou – keyboards
 Gary Barnacle – alto saxophone, tenor saxophone, electric saxophone

Production
 Produced and engineered by Ken Scott for KoMos Productions.
 Assisted by James Tippett-IIes and Jim Russell
 Mixed at Park Gate Studios
 Mastered by Bernie Grundman at A&M Studios (Los Angeles, CA).
 Sleeve design – Baker Dave and Malcolm Garrett for Assorted Images.
 Photography – Sheila Rock

Chart positions

Album charts

Single charts

References

External links
 

1984 albums
Level 42 albums
Albums produced by Ken Scott
Polydor Records albums